34th Division or 34th Infantry Division may refer to:

Infantry divisions
 34th Division (German Empire)
 34th Infantry Division (Wehrmacht)
 34th SS Volunteer Grenadier Division Landstorm Nederland
 34th Division (Imperial Japanese Army)
 34th Infantry Division (India), British Indian Army
 34th Infantry Division (Russian Empire)
 34th Rifle Division (Soviet Union)
 34th Guards Rifle Division, Soviet Union
34th Motor Rifle Division
 34th Division (United Kingdom)
 34th Infantry Division (United States)

Cavalry divisions
 34th Cavalry Division (Soviet Union), a Soviet cavalry divisions 1917–45

Armoured divisions
 34th Tank Division (Soviet Union)
 34th Guards Artillery Division, Soviet Union and Russia

Aviation divisions
 34th Transport Aviation Division (People's Liberation Army Air Force)
 34th Air Division, United States

See also 
 34th Battalion (disambiguation)
 34th Brigade (disambiguation)
 34th Regiment (disambiguation)